Serena Williams defeated Dinara Safina in the final, 6–0, 6–3 to win the women's singles tennis title at the 2009 Australian Open. It was her fourth Australian Open singles title and tenth major singles title overall. With the win, Williams regained the world No. 1 ranking.

Maria Sharapova was the reigning champion, but withdrew from the tournament due to a recurring shoulder injury.

This was also the first Australian Open to feature three Russian semifinalists, those being Safina, Vera Zvonareva and Elena Dementieva.

Seeds

Qualifying

Draw

Finals

Top half

Section 1

Section 2

Section 3

Section 4

Bottom half

Section 5

Section 6

Section 7

Section 8

Championship match statistics

External links
 2009 Australian Open – Women's draws and results at the International Tennis Federation

Women's Singles
Australian Open (tennis) by year – Women's singles
2009 in Australian women's sport